Federal Highway 111 (Carretera Federal 111) is a Federal Highway of Mexico. The highway is a short connector route that links the Buenavista, Querétaro area at Mexican Federal Highway 57 in the east to San Miguel de Allende, Guanajuato in the west.

References

111
Transportation in Guanajuato
Transportation in Querétaro